Petrofac Limited is an international energy services company that designs, builds, manages and maintains oil, gas, refining, petrochemicals and renewable energy infrastructure. It is registered in Jersey (number 81792), with its main corporate office on Jermyn Street, London. It has operational centres in Aberdeen, Sharjah, Woking, Chennai, Mumbai, Abu Dhabi, Saudi Arabia and Kuala Lumpur. There are another 24 offices in various countries. The company is listed on the London Stock Exchange.

History
The company was established as a producer of a modular plant in Tyler, Texas, United States in 1981. It was first listed on the London Stock Exchange in 2005. In 2010, it bought a 20 percent share in the Gateway storage scheme, an undersea cavern for gas storage. In November 2013, Petrofac and the Italian oil firm Bonatti partnered on a $650 million joint venture with Sonatrach to develop new separation and booster compression facilities, extending the life of the Alrar gas field in south-east Algeria. In November 2014, the company issued a profit warning, saying that profit for 2015 would fall by 25%, as slowing demand in China and abundant US output cut the oil price.

In January 2021, a former Global Head of Sales at Petrofac Ltd., which serves the British energy industry, pleaded guilty to charges related to bribery. The UK Serious Fraud Office confirmed that David Lufkin offered and paid around $30 million to win United Arab Emirates contracts worth $3.3 billion for Petrofac between 2012 and 2018. The guilty plea included 11 other charges of bribery, where Lufkin made corrupt offers to influence contract awards of more than $3.5 billion in Saudi Arabia, and over $730 million in Iraq. In October 2021 Petrofac was fined £77m for seven charges of failing to prevent bribery in the Middle East.

Services
Petrofac is organised into three divisions:
 Engineering & Construction (E&C)
 Engineering & Production Services (EPS)
 Integrated Energy Services (IES)

References

External links
Official Petrofac company website

Oil and gas companies of the United Kingdom
Companies based in the City of Westminster
British companies established in 1981
Non-renewable resource companies established in 1981
1981 establishments in England
Companies of Jersey
Companies listed on the London Stock Exchange